Big Red Letter Day is the fourth album by American alternative rock band Buffalo Tom, released in 1993.

The leadoff track, "Sodajerk," was featured on the soundtrack for the short-lived television series My So-Called Life and in commercials for Nike and Pontiac. "Late at Night" was also used in an episode of My So-Called Life.

The album peaked at number 185 on the Billboard 200.

Critical reception 

Author Dave Thompson praised the album in his book Alternative Rock, writing that "Buffalo Tom jangle and twang with the best of them, filling Red Letter with moody melodies lightened by harmonies and the exquisite guitars. College rock rarely sounded this good."

Track listing 
 "Sodajerk" 
 "I'm Allowed"  
 "Tree House"  
 "Would Not Be Denied" 
 "Latest Monkey"  
 "My Responsibility"  
 "Dry Land"  
 "Torch Singer"  
 "Late at Night"  
 "Suppose"  
 "Anything That Way"

All songs by Buffalo Tom.

Personnel 
Buffalo Tom
Bill Janovitz – vocals, guitar
Chris Colbourn – bass
Tom Maginnis – drums

Charts

References 

Buffalo Tom albums
1993 albums
Beggars Banquet Records albums